Teddy Lehman (born November 18, 1981) is an American former college and professional football player who was a linebacker in the National Football League (NFL) for seven seasons.  He played college football for the University of Oklahoma, and was twice recognized as a consensus All-American.  The Detroit Lions chose him in the second round of the 2004 NFL Draft, and he also played for the Buffalo Bills and Jacksonville Jaguars of the NFL, and the Las Vegas Locomotives of the United Football League (UFL).

Early years
Lehman was born in Tulsa, Oklahoma.  He attended Fort Gibson High School in Fort Gibson, Oklahoma, and played high school football for the Fort Gibson Tigers.  He started at both linebacker and running back, wearing number 34. As a senior, he helped the Tigers post their best-ever record of 13–1, and advance to the Oklahoma Class 4A state championship game.

He ended his senior season with 151 tackles, 3 interceptions, 2 sacks, and 3 forced fumbles.  He ranked third in the state in rushing with 1,252 yards and 16 touchdowns on 206 carries (6.1 avg.) as a running back.  He also shared the punting duties for the Tigers with an average of 39.6 yards.

He recorded more than 400 tackles and 7 interceptions during his four high school seasons. He was not highly recruited out of high school but ran a 4.4 40-yard dash at an Oklahoma football camp for high school players and was offered a scholarship shortly after.

College career
While attending the University of Oklahoma, Lehman played for coach Bob Stoops's Oklahoma Sooners football team from 2000 to 2003.  As a freshman in 2000, he played in 12 games, mostly on special teams and as a reserve at linebacker.

During his 2001 sophomore season, he became the starting middle linebacker.  Memorably, he caught the interception by Texas quarterback Chris Simms which was jarred loose by Roy Williams and Lehman took it into the endzone for the game clinching score.  He finished the season with 83 tackles, including 2 sacks and 10 stops for losses.

In 2002, Lehman moved to weakside linebacker, replacing Butkus Award winner Rocky Calmus. Lehman was recognized as a consensus first-team All-American, after receiving first-team honors from the Associated Press, the Football Writers Association of America, the Walter Camp Foundation, The Sporting News, CNNSI, ESPN and Sports Illustrated.  He posted six tackles (five unassisted) in the Rose Bowl against Washington State and sacked quarterback Jason Gesser twice for a loss of 17 yards.  Both sacks ended scoring drives at the end of the second quarter and were instrumental in securing Oklahoma's first-ever Rose Bowl win.

During the 2003 season, the senior led the team in tackles, with 117, adding 1 forced fumbles, 2 interceptions, and 19 tackles for loss.   Lehman closed out his college career in the 21-14 Sugar Bowl loss against the LSU Tigers with eight tackles (six solo) and two stops behind the line of scrimmage, including one sack.  He was recognized as a unanimous first-team All-American and a first-team All-Big 12 selection.  He was awarded the Dick Butkus Award, given to the nation's top linebacker, as well as the Chuck Bednarik Award, given to the nation's top defensive player.  Lehman was rated the top outside linebacker pro prospect in the country by The NFL Draft Report.

Professional career

First stint with Lions
Teddy Lehman was drafted by the Detroit Lions with the fifth pick of the second round (37th overall) in 2004.

Lehman was the only rookie linebacker in the NFL to start all 16 games in 2004. He also logged a total of 1,225 plays (1,054 on defense, 171 on special teams), more than any other member of the team.  He finished the season with 102 tackles, the second-highest total on the team.

Tampa Bay Buccaneers
He signed with the Tampa Bay Buccaneers as an unrestricted free-agent on March 4, 2008. However, he was released on July 25.

Second stint with Lions
On July 26, 2008, Lehman re-signed with the Detroit Lions. His No. 54 taken by Gilbert Gardner, Lehman was assigned No. 58.  He was placed on Injured Reserve on August 4.  On August 8, he was taken off IR and released.

Buffalo Bills
Lehman was signed by the Buffalo Bills on November 7, 2008 after cornerback Ashton Youboty was placed on injured reserve.

Las Vegas Locomotives
Lehman signed with the Las Vegas Locomotives of the United Football League on August 5, 2009.

Jacksonville Jaguars
On May 11, 2010 Teddy Lehman signed a contract with the Jacksonville Jaguars. He was one of eight players that participated in the club’s May 1–3 mini-camp on a tryout basis. On September 3, 2010, he was released by the Jaguars.

Life after football
Lehman and his wife Erin reside in Norman, Oklahoma.  Teddy now has a local Sportstalk Radio show, "The Rush," on Sportstalk 1400AM. He's also the color radio analyst for the University of Oklahoma football games.

References

External links
Buffalo Bills bio

1981 births
Living people
Sportspeople from Tulsa, Oklahoma
People from Fort Gibson, Oklahoma
All-American college football players
American football linebackers
Buffalo Bills players
Detroit Lions players
Jacksonville Jaguars players
Las Vegas Locomotives players
Oklahoma Sooners football players
Players of American football from Oklahoma
Tampa Bay Buccaneers players